Pir Bodagh (also Romanized as Pīr Bodāgh ; also known as Pīr Bodāq and Pīr Bolāgh) is a village in Sanjabad-e Gharbi Rural District, in the Central District of Kowsar County, Ardabil Province, Iran. At the 2006 census, its population was 316, in 57 families.

References 

Tageo

Towns and villages in Kowsar County